The American Catholic Church in the United States (ACCUS) is an Independent Catholic church primarily in the United States, founded in 1999. ACCUS is an offshoot of the Independent Catholic movement, and so has no ecclesiastical relation with the Catholic Church. ACCUS claims apostolic succession through Duarte Costa.

Overview
ACCUS is listed as 501(c)(3) under the name American Catholic Church, Frederick, MD.

History
The American Catholic Church in the United States was founded in Frederick, Maryland, by Lawrence J. Harms.

At the beginning of 2018, ACCUS was composed of 1 bishop, 15 priests, and 3 deacons in 13 states.

Theology and sacraments
The American Catholic Church in the United States states that it adheres to the doctrine of Vatican Council II. ACCUS celebrates the seven sacraments of Baptism, Confirmation, Communion, Reconciliation, Anointing of the Sick, Holy Orders and Matrimony, and believes the sacrament of marriage can be celebrated for same-sex couples.

References

External links
Homepage of the American Catholic Church in the U.S.

Christian organizations established in 1999
Christian denominations established in the 20th century
Old Catholic denominations in the United States
Independent Catholic denominations
1999 establishments in the United States